St. Elizabeth's Health Center (SEHC) is a faith-based community health clinic in Tucson, Arizona. St. Elizabeth's Health Center, known colloquially as Saint Elizabeth's, serves uninsured and underserved persons in Southern Arizona.

Mission statement
Since 1961, St. Elizabeth's has provided medical, dental, behavioral and preventive health services to the working poor using a sliding-fee scale and community partnerships. In 2010, SEHC provided 25,000 visits to persons of all ages seeking care who either did not qualify for or could not afford health insurance.

According to their website, "St. Elizabeth's operates with patient fees that are decided on a sliding scale according to what patients can afford. A large number of volunteer health care providers serve St. Elizabeth's patients including doctors, dentists, behavioral health professionals, nurse practitioners, nurses and others.

"St. Elizabeth's Health Center has many community partners that make it possible to serve our patients and coordinate affordable care. Through these partnerships, patients are able to have many of their health care needs taken care of."

History
SEHC was established in 1962 as the St. Elizabeth of Hungary Clinic. In 2008, the clinic's name was changed to St. Elizabeth's Health Center.

References

External links 
St. Elizabeth's Health Center Website

Buildings and structures in Tucson, Arizona